Wijit Suksompong (born 19 May 1946) is a Thai archer. He competed in the men's individual event at the 1976 Summer Olympics.

References

1946 births
Living people
Wijit Suksompong
Wijit Suksompong
Archers at the 1976 Summer Olympics
Place of birth missing (living people)